This is the results breakdown of the local elections held in Andalusia on 27 May 2007. The following tables show detailed results in the autonomous community's most populous municipalities, sorted alphabetically.

Overall

City control
The following table lists party control in the most populous municipalities, including provincial capitals (shown in bold). Gains for a party are displayed with the cell's background shaded in that party's colour.

Municipalities

Alcalá de Guadaíra
Population: 64,990

Algeciras
Population: 112,937

Almería
Population: 185,309

Antequera
Population: 44,032

Benalmádena
Population: 50,298

Cádiz
Population: 130,561

Chiclana de la Frontera
Population: 72,364

Córdoba
Population: 322,867

Dos Hermanas
Population: 114,672

Écija
Population: 39,295

El Ejido
Population: 75,969

El Puerto de Santa María
Population: 83,101

Fuengirola
Population: 63,899

Granada
Population: 237,929

Huelva
Population: 145,763

Jaén
Population: 116,769

Jerez de la Frontera
Population: 199,544

La Línea de la Concepción
Population: 63,026

Linares
Population: 61,452

Málaga
Population: 560,631

Marbella
Population: 125,519

Morón de la Frontera
Population: 28,295

Motril
Population: 57,895

Ronda
Population: 35,836

San Fernando
Population: 93,544

Sanlúcar de Barrameda
Population: 63,509

Seville

Population: 704,414

Utrera
Population: 48,222

Vélez-Málaga
Population: 67,697

References

Andalusia
2007